Bouth is a village in the South Lakeland district of Cumbria, England. Historically, it was part of the county of Lancashire.

Christine McVie (née Perfect), rock singer, keyboardist and songwriter of Fleetwood Mac was born in the village, the daughter of a concert violinist and a faith healer.

The village's pub, the White Hart, was shown in the short-lived 1990 ITV sitcom Not with a Bang.

See also

Listed buildings in Colton, Cumbria

References

External links

Villages in Cumbria
Colton, Cumbria